This is a list of notable players who have played for the Puerto Rico Islanders, whether or not they have a Wikipedia article. It includes players that have made a notable contribution to the club or members of the club's first ever side.

List of Players
Players are listed according to the year of their first professional contracted signed with the club. Appearances and goals are for first-team competitive matches only. Substitute appearances included. Statistics are correct as of 2008-11-11.

Key to positions

References

 
Association football player non-biographical articles
Puerto Rico Islanders